Shayla is an Islamic headgear worn by women. It is also a feminine given name.

People
 Shayla Beesley (born 1991), American actress
 Shayla LaVeaux (born 1969), American pornographic actress and exotic dancer
 Shayla Worley (born 1990), American artistic gymnast

Media
 "Shayla" (song), song by band Blondie from their 1979 album Eat to the Beat

See also 

Sheila (disambiguation)
Sharla
Shyla